Ann Cuerton Davies (25 November 1934 – 26 April 2022) was an English actress. Davies was the wife of actor Richard Briers until his death in February 2013, and the mother of actress Lucy Briers and Katie Briers. She also acted with Briers in the films Peter's Friends (1992) and In the Bleak Midwinter (1995).

One of her earliest television appearances was as the character Jenny in the BBC series Doctor Who in the story entitled The Dalek Invasion of Earth. In 2003, Davies appeared in an episode of the series Doctors as the character Annette Ludlow.

Davies appeared alongside her husband in the radio adaptation of the TV series Brothers in Law.

Davies died on 26 April 2022, at the age of 87.

References

External links

1934 births
2022 deaths
20th-century English actresses
21st-century English actresses
Actresses from London
English film actresses
English television actresses